The WWE Universal Championship is a world heavyweight championship created and promoted by the American professional wrestling promotion WWE, representing the SmackDown brand division. It is one of two world titles for WWE's main roster, alongside Raw's WWE Championship. The current champion is Roman Reigns, who is in his second reign, which is the longest reign for the title. As Reigns concurrently holds the WWE Championship, he presently defends the titles together across both brands as the Undisputed WWE Universal Championship, although both titles retain their individual lineages.

Named in honor of WWE's fans, referred to as the WWE Universe, the championship was established on July 25, 2016, to be the top title of the Raw brand. Its creation came as a result of the reintroduction of the brand split and subsequent draft on July 19, 2016, in which the WWE Championship, the promotion's original world title, became exclusive to SmackDown. The inaugural Universal Champion was Finn Bálor. Since its inception, matches for the championship have headlined several pay-per-view and livestreaming events, including six consecutive SummerSlams from 2017 to 2022, as well as WrestleMania 34,  37 Night 2, and 38 Night 2, both being two of WWE's "big five" pay-per-views, the latter of which is WWE's flagship event. Following the events of the 2019 Crown Jewel, the Universal and WWE Championship switched brands.

History 

In mid-2016, the professional wrestling promotion WWE reintroduced the brand extension in which the promotion split its main roster between the Raw and SmackDown brands, where wrestlers would exclusively perform on each brands' respective weekly television program (the original brand split ended in August 2011). On July 19, 2016, to coincide with SmackDown shifting to a live broadcast format, the 2016 WWE Draft took place. During the draft, Dean Ambrose, who held the promotion's original world heavyweight championship, the WWE Championship, was drafted to SmackDown. At Battleground on July 24, Ambrose retained the title in a triple threat match against Raw draftees Seth Rollins and Roman Reigns, thus leaving Raw without a world title. On the following episode of Raw, the brand's Commissioner Stephanie McMahon and General Manager Mick Foley established the WWE Universal Championship to serve as the brand's top championship. The title was named in honor of the WWE Universe, the name the promotion uses to refer to its fan base.

The inaugural champion was crowned at SummerSlam on August 21 in a pinfall and submission-only singles match. Seth Rollins was automatically set for that match as he was Raw's number one draft pick and was not pinned in the WWE Championship match at Battleground. His opponent was determined by two fatal four-way matches on Raw, with the winners wrestling each other in a singles match. Finn Bálor won the first fatal four-way by defeating Cesaro, Kevin Owens, and Rusev while Roman Reigns won the second by defeating Chris Jericho, Sami Zayn, and Sheamus. Bálor then defeated Reigns and was added to the title match. At SummerSlam, Bálor, wrestling under his "Demon" persona, defeated Rollins to become the inaugural champion. Bálor was the first WWE wrestler to win a world title in his pay-per-view debut as well as winning his first world title in less than a month of his debut on WWE's main roster. During the championship match, Bálor suffered a legitimate shoulder injury and was forced to vacate the title the following day.

At Crown Jewel on October 31, 2019, SmackDown wrestler "The Fiend" Bray Wyatt won the Universal title by defeating Seth Rollins in a Falls Count Anywhere match that could not be stopped for any reason, thus transferring the Universal Championship to SmackDown. The WWE Championship was subsequently transferred to Raw after reigning champion Brock Lesnar quit SmackDown the following day, taking the title to Raw.

At WrestleMania 38 Night 2 on April 3, 2022, reigning Universal Champion Roman Reigns defeated Raw's WWE Champion Brock Lesnar in a Winner Takes All match to claim both championships and become recognized as the Undisputed WWE Universal Champion. WWE had billed the match as a championship unification match; however, both titles remain independently active with Reigns being a double champion, defending both titles together across both brands as the Undisputed WWE Universal Championship.

Brand designation 
The following is a list of dates indicating the transitions of the WWE Universal Championship between the Raw and SmackDown brands.

Championship belt design 
The Universal Championship belt is similar in appearance to the WWE Championship belt (introduced in 2014), with a few notable differences. Like the WWE Championship belt, the center plate is a large cut out of the WWE logo with diamonds sitting inside an irregular heptagonal plate, but with the capital words "Universal Champion" in small print sitting underneath the logo. Just the same, there are gold divider bars that separate the center plate from its two side plates. Each side plate features the same default removable center section as the WWE Championship (the WWE logo over a red globe), which can be customized with the champion's logo. The most prominent difference is the belt's strap, the color of which indicates the brand it is exclusive to. When the belt was first unveiled at SummerSlam 2016, the strap was red to symbolize its exclusivity to the Raw brand, and the underline of the WWE logo on the center plate was black to make it visible (essentially the reverse of the WWE Championship belt). After the title became exclusive to SmackDown in late 2019, Bray Wyatt introduced a blue strap variation and the underline of the WWE logo was changed from black to red.

In addition to the SmackDown version of the belt, Wyatt also introduced a custom version of the championship for his "Fiend" character on the November 29 episode of SmackDown. The custom belt featured The Fiend's face in the place of the center plate. The character's phrases "Hurt" and "Heal" were written in red on black leather strips in the place of side plates while the strap of the belt itself was red and black worn leather with red stitching holding it together. The character's phrase "Let Me In" was also included. Wyatt used both the standard and custom versions of the championship; his cheery Firefly Fun House character held the standard blue belt, while his sinister Fiend character held the custom belt.

Reception 
The Universal Championship design was heavily criticized. Jason Powell of Pro Wrestling Dot Net referred to it as "a title belt that no one likes". Adam Silverstein of CBS Sports described it as "ugly" while the live SummerSlam audience in Brooklyn, New York gave derisive chants, including "This belt sucks", an assessment with which New England Sports Network reporters agreed. That site's Ricky Doyle wrote that the crowd response turned what should have been a "landmark moment for the company" into an "awkward experience". Mike Johnson of Pro Wrestling Insider felt the title looked like a "xerox" of the WWE Championship and did not blame the audience for reacting negatively. The design was also unpopular with online wrestling fans.

WWE employees responded in the aftermath of the title's debut. Seth Rollins chastised the SummerSlam crowd's reaction, writing on Twitter: "More important than a title's appearance is what it represents for the men fighting over it. You really let me down tonight, Brooklyn." While acknowledging that he himself might have chosen a different belt design, Mick Foley echoed Rollins's response in a lengthy Facebook post. He recalled being presented with the WWF Hardcore Championship, a title belt made of broken metal pieces held together by duct tape, which challengers "made ... mean something by busting [their] asses". In a kayfabe promo on the following episode of Raw, the then-villainous Rollins called the championship belt "beautiful".

Later in 2016, Jim Vorel of Paste ranked the title as the worst of nine then contested in WWE, noting its "obnoxious" design. On the other hand, Nick Schwartz of Fox Sports wrote: "It's really not as bad as fans made it seem at SummerSlam. It's fine."

Reigns 

Finn Bálor was the inaugural champion. Brock Lesnar holds the record for most reigns with three. Roman Reigns' ongoing second reign is the longest singular reign at + days, while Bálor has the shortest reign at 22 hours as he was forced to vacate the title due to suffering a legitimate injury in winning it. Reigns also holds the record for longest combined reign at + days. Kevin Owens is the youngest champion when he won it at  old, while Goldberg is the oldest when he won the title for a second time at 53.

Roman Reigns is the current champion in his second reign. He won the title by defeating previous champion "The Fiend" Bray Wyatt and Braun Strowman, who Reigns pinned, in a No Holds Barred triple threat match at Payback on August 30, 2020, in Orlando, Florida. After winning the WWE Championship at WrestleMania 38 on April 3, 2022, Reigns is recognized as the Undisputed WWE Universal Champion.

Combined reigns 

Notes

See also
 World championships in WWE

References

External links 
 
 

World heavyweight wrestling championships
WWE championships